The Novator RK-55 Relief ( 'Relief'; NATO: SSC-X-4 'Slingshot'; GRAU: 3K12) is a Russian land-based and submarine-launched cruise missile with a nuclear warhead developed in the Soviet Union. It was about to enter service in 1987, when such weapons were banned under the Intermediate-Range Nuclear Forces Treaty. A version launched from submarine torpedo tubes, the S-10 Granat (SS-N-21 'Sampson'; GRAU: 3K10), has apparently been converted to carry conventional warheads and continues in service to this day.  The Russian Federation was reported to have deployed the derivative SS-CX-7/SS-CX-8 systems on February 14, 2017.

The RK-55 is very similar to the air-launched Kh-55 (AS-15 'Kent') but the Kh-55 has a drop-down turbofan engine and was designed by MKB Raduga. Both have formed the basis of post-Cold-War missiles, in particular the 3M-54 Kalibr which has a supersonic approach phase.

Development
In the late 1960s, the "Ekho" study conducted by the GosNIIAS institute concluded that it would be more effective to deploy many small, subsonic cruise missiles than the much more expensive supersonic missiles then in favour. In 1971 Raduga began working on the air-launched Kh-55, which first flew in 1976. That same year, RK-55 first flew. NPO Novator would work on the submarine- and ground-launched versions. In 1993 Novator exhibited the Sizzler series weapons, which appears to be based on the RK-55. It is a two-stage design, which goes supersonic during its final approach to the target.

Design
Six RK-55 missiles are carried on an eight-wheeled transporter-erector-launcher (TEL) based on the  MAZ 543 launcher of the R-17 (SS-1 'Scud B').

The S-10 is launched through 533 mm torpedo tubes.

Operational history
Fewer than 100 RK-55s had been deployed by the end of 1988. The new  was the first class to receive the new missile. It was later fitted on the Sierra I/II and Victor III classes and the new s.

Four s deployed in 1988 is a design of particular note, replacing the missile compartment with additional torpedo tubes for 35-40 land attack cruise missiles. They were probably nuclear-tipped S-10s during the Cold War, and then converted to use conventional warheads  after the START I treaty restricted sub-launched nuclear cruise missiles. The US Navy has done the same on a grander scale with the SSGN conversions of four s. It has been suggested that S-10's could in future be fitted to converted s, or to surface ships, but these have not been confirmed.

The ground-launched variant was subject to the Intermediate-Range Nuclear Forces Treaty signed in December 1987 and had been tested. Six launchers with 84 missiles was deployed at the Missile/Launcher Storage in Jelgava (Latvian Soviet Socialist Republic) and had been destroyed by November 1990.

In early 2017, US officials and analyst Jeffrey Lewis asserted that Russia was violating the INF through the deployment of the 9M728 (SSC-X-7) and 9M729 (SSC-X-8) missiles as part of the Iskander missile system. These are widely reported as variants of the earlier SS-C-4. According to U.S officials, two missile battalions equipped with SSC-8 were deployed as of 14 February 2017 in violation of the treaty. Each battalion consists of 4 launchers, each launcher supplied with six nuclear-tipped cruise missiles. One battalion is allegedly located at Kapustin Yar near Volgograd; the other's location is unknown at this time. The German newspaper FAZ argued in February 2019 that in addition to two known locations where missiles and battalions are stationed – at a launch pad at Kapustin Yar, in southern Russia, and Yekaterinburg – there would be two other places equipped with these missiles: Mozdok in North Ossetia and Shuya near Moscow. Each of the four battalions would have four-wheeled launchers, each carrying four missiles, adds the German media. This adds to 64 SSC-8 missiles in Russia's possession, which can be armed with conventional or nuclear warheads. This type of missile has a range of 2,350 kilometers. With a conventional warhead of 500 kilograms, the range is 2,000 kilometers.

Variants
 RK-55 (SSC-X-4 'Slingshot') – ground-based version
 S-10 (SS-N-21 'Sampson') – submarine-launched version
 9M728 and 9M729 (SSC-7 and SSC-8 'Screwdriver') – ground-based version, assessed range , nuclear capable

Conventional unitary High Explosive (HE) warhead and submunition warhead versions of the RK-55 have probably been developed, to justify the continuing service of the submarines that carry them.

Operators

Former

Derivatives 

 Korshun (Luch Artem - KhAZ - Vizar ZhMZ - Yuzhnoe Pivdenmash) with MS400  (Ivchenko Progres Motor Sich) engine.

Similar weapons

 Ground Launched Cruise Missile (BGM-109G Gryphon) - land-based Tomahawk with tactical nuclear warhead of 10-50 kt and 2000–2500 km range
 Pershing 1b and Pershing II RR - 740 km range ballistic missile also in testing at the time of the INF Treaty.
 Raduga Kh-55 - originally thought in the West to be an air-launched version of the RK-55, now has tactical versions such as the Kh-555 and the stealthy Kh-101.
 UGM-109 Tomahawk - the Capsule Launch System allows Tomahawks to be fired from torpedo tubes or dedicated submarine launch tubes

See also
Intermediate-range ballistic missile

Notes and references

External links
 
 Missile Threat - SS-N-21 (RK-55) at CSIS
 SSC-X-8 at GlobalSecurity.org

RK-055
RK-055
Surface-to-surface missiles
NPO Novator products
Military equipment introduced in the 1980s